Anett Sopronyi (born 27 November 1986 in Debrecen) is a retired Hungarian handballer who most recently played for DVSC and the Hungarian national team.

Sopronyi was spotted by Itxako in the 2010–11 edition of the EHF Champions League, where her former team DVSC faced the Spanish club, and she also made a good impression on the Szabella Cup, where the two sides met again. She was eventually signed by Itxako in December 2011 to cover the right back position, for that they were lack of a left handed player.

In 2015 she decided to retire due to a serious injury.

She made her international debut on 3 March 2007 against Norway, and represented Hungary at two European Championships (2008, 2010).

Achievements
Nemzeti Bajnokság I:
Silver Medallist: 2008, 2011
Magyar Kupa:
Silver Medallist: 2008, 2011
Youth European Championship:
Bronze Medallist: 2003
World University Championship:
Winner: 2010
Silver Medallist: 2006, 2008

Individual awards
 Nemzeti Bajnokság I Top Scorer: 2009

References

External links
 Anett Sopronyi career statistics at Worldhandball

Living people
1986 births
Sportspeople from Debrecen
Hungarian female handball players
Expatriate handball players
Hungarian expatriate sportspeople in Spain
Hungarian expatriate sportspeople in Serbia